Fnality International is a financial technology firm founded in 2019 by a consortium of international banks and an exchange to create a network of distributed financial market infrastructures (dFMIs) using Blockchain to deliver the means of payment-on-chain for wholesale banking markets.

Overview 

Fnality International was launched on 3 June 2019 with the completion of an equity Series A round of £50 million.

The founding shareholders were Banco Santander, The Bank of New York Mellon, Barclays, Canadian Imperial Bank of Commerce, Commerzbank, Credit Suisse, ING Group, KBC Bank, Lloyds Banking Group, Mitsubishi UFJ Financial Group, Nasdaq, Sumitomo Mitsui Banking Corporation, State Street Corporation and UBS

Mizuho Bank joined the original group of 14 founding shareholders on 12 September 2019.

Fnality International is a member of the Enterprise Ethereum Alliance and the International Securities Services Association (ISSA).

History 

During conversations on market structure between Hyder Jaffrey from the UBS Innovation team and Robert Sams, CEO of UK-based Blockchain company Clearmatics, the discussion soon narrowed its focus to the need for an on-chain digital payment asset as an essential part of the infrastructure that will support tokenised markets.

In September 2015, the Swiss bank launched the Utility Settlement Coin (USC) research and development project.

In August 2016, BNY Mellon, Deutsche Bank, Santander, broker/dealer ICAP and the financial services firm NEX (since merged), Barclays, HSBC, State Street, Credit Suisse, MUFG and the Canadian Imperial Bank of Commerce joined the USC project.

Product 

Fnality Global Payments will be made up of a series of Fnality Locals which will each run a payment system in a particular currency in accordance with jurisdictional regulations and standards; a Fnality Payments System. In each currency the Fnality Payments System is an independent distributed financial market infrastructure (dFMI) which will operate a private, permissioned distributed ledger to support the creation of a settlement asset for use as an on-chain, digital payment instrument.
In respect of a Fnality Payment System, the associated settlement asset is the accounting unit used to digitally represent a participant's ownership over a claim, entitlement or interest in respect of funds held in the system account (the central bank account of the Fnality Payment System). This will be a settlement asset denominated in the fiat currency of the relevant jurisdiction or currency area.

Initially, five currencies are in scope:
  CAD Canadian dollar
  EUR Euro
  GBP Pound sterling
  JPY Japanese yen
  USD United States dollar

References

See also

 Distributed ledger
 Blockchain
 Tokenization
 Payment
 Payment system

Financial technology companies
Financial services companies established in 2019